Mexicoscylus is a genus of longhorn beetles of the subfamily Lamiinae, containing the following species:

 Mexicoscylus bivittatus (Gahan, 1892)
 Mexicoscylus nigritarse Galileo & Martins, 2013
 Mexicoscylus rosae Martins & Galileo, 2011

References

Hemilophini